Paralio Astros is a port serving the inland town of Astros, Arcadia, Greece. It is part of the municipality North Kynouria and is considered a traditional settlement. It is built on the northern part of the coast of Arcadia in the eastern Peloponnese. As of 2011, the port had 1,043 permanent inhabitants.

Paralio Astros possesses beaches and a harbour (renovated in 2015) which can accommodate small ships. A medieval Frankish fortress commands the heights of a peninsula called "The Island" which juts out to form the harbour. The main square is at the foot of the castle mount.

Nowadays its principal industry is tourism. It is a popular vacation spot for inhabitants of Tripoli and other parts of Greece.

See also
Lepida Gorge
List of settlements in Arcadia
List of traditional settlements of Greece

References

External links 

Populated places in Arcadia, Peloponnese